Halifax Lions

A team operated from 1977-1989, now Pictou County Crushers.
A team operated from 2008-2010, now Valley Wildcats.